Rhopalocnemis is a genus of flowering plants belonging to the family Balanophoraceae.

Its native range is Himalaya to Southern China and Malesia.

Species:
 Rhopalocnemis phalloides Jungh.

References

Balanophoraceae
Santalales genera
Taxa named by Franz Wilhelm Junghuhn